The FIBA EuroBasket All-Tournament Team is the FIBA Europe award that is bestowed upon the five best players of each FIBA EuroBasket tournament. Pau Gasol holds the record for most selections in the All-EuroBasket Team, with seven.

FIBA EuroBasket All-Tournament Teams

1937 EuroBasket

1939 EuroBasket

1967 EuroBasket

1969 EuroBasket

1971 EuroBasket

1973 EuroBasket

1975 EuroBasket

1977 EuroBasket

1979 EuroBasket

1981 EuroBasket

1983 EuroBasket

1985 EuroBasket

1987 EuroBasket

1989 EuroBasket

1991 EuroBasket

1993 EuroBasket

1995 EuroBasket

1997 EuroBasket

1999 EuroBasket

2001 EuroBasket

2003 EuroBasket

2005 EuroBasket

2007 EuroBasket

2009 EuroBasket

2011 EuroBasket

2013 EuroBasket

2015 EuroBasket

2017 EuroBasket

2022 EuroBasket

Most appearances

See also 
 FIBA EuroBasket
 FIBA EuroBasket Records
 FIBA EuroBasket MVP
 FIBA World Cup
 FIBA World Cup Records
 FIBA World Cup MVP
 FIBA World Cup All-Tournament Team
 FIBA's 50 Greatest Players (1991)

References

External links 
 
 

Team
European basketball awards